Cantharidella tiberiana is a species of sea snail, a marine gastropod mollusk in the family Trochidae, the top snails.

Description
The size of the shell varies between 4 mm and 9 mm.
The imperforate, rather thin shell has a conical shape. It is olivaceous with nacreous reflections. It is ornamented with flexuous longitudinal grayish streaks. The spire is moderately elevated. The suture is impressed. The 5½ to 6 whorls are subplanate with the body whorl obtusely angulated.  The base of the shell is obsoletely striated and covered with spots of grayish-white. The aperture is oblique, quadrate, inside white and nacreous. The columella is somewhat expanded. The outer lip is simple and acute.

Distribution
This marine species is endemic to Australia and occurs off New South Wales, Victoria, South Australia and Tasmania,

References

 Adams, A. & Angas, G.F. 1864. Descriptions of new species of shells, chiefly from Australia in the collection of Mr Angas. Proceedings of the Zoological Society of London 1864: 35-40
 Angas, G.F. 1865. On the marine molluscan fauna of the Province of South Australia, with a list of all the species known up to the present time, together with remarks on their habitats and distribution, etc. Proceedings of the Zoological Society of London 1865: 155-"180" 
 Angas, G.F. 1867. A list of species of marine Mollusca found in Port Jackson harbour, New South Wales and on the adjacent coasts, with notes on their habits etc. Proceedings of the Zoological Society of London 1867: 185–233, 912-935
 Tenison-Woods, J.E. 1878. On some new marine Mollusca. Transactions and Proceedings of the Royal Society of Victoria 14: 55-65
 Fischer, P. 1879. Genres Calcar, Trochus, Xenophora, Tectarius et Risella. 337-463, 120 pls in Keiner, L.C. (ed.). Spécies general et iconographie des coquilles vivantes. Paris : J.B. Baillière Vol. 3
 Tenison-Woods, J.E. 1879. Census; with brief descriptions of the marine shells of Tasmania and the adjacent islands. Proceedings of the Royal Society of Tasmania 1877: 26-57
 Whitelegge, T. 1889. List of the Marine and Fresh-Water Invertebrate Fauna of Port Jackson and Neighbourhood. Proceedings of the Royal Society of New South Wales 23: 1-161
 Tate, R. 1897. Critical remarks on some Australian Mollusca. Transactions of the Royal Society of South Australia 1897: 40-49 
 Tate, R. & May, W.L. 1901. A revised census of the marine Mollusca of Tasmania. Proceedings of the Linnean Society of New South Wales 26(3): 344-471
 Pritchard, G.B. & Gatliff, J.H. 1902. Catalogue of the marine shells of Victoria. Part V. Proceedings of the Royal Society of Victoria 14(2): 85-138
 May, W.L 1903. On Tenison-Woods types in the Tasmanian Museum, Hobart. Proceedings of the Royal Society of Tasmania 1902: 106-114
 Hedley, C. 1918. A checklist of the marine fauna of New South Wales. Part 1. Journal and Proceedings of the Royal Society of New South Wales 51: M1-M120
 May, W.L. 1921. A Checklist of the Mollusca of Tasmania. Hobart, Tasmania : Government Printer 114 pp. 
 May, W.L. 1923. An Illustrated Index of Tasmanian Shells. Hobart : Government Printer 100 pp. 
 Iredale, T. & McMichael, D.F. 1962. A reference list of the marine Mollusca of New South Wales. Memoirs of the Australian Museum 11: 1-109 
 Macpherson, J.H. & Gabriel, C.J. 1962. Marine Molluscs of Victoria. Melbourne : Melbourne University Press & National Museum of Victoria 475 pp
 Macpherson, J.H. 1966. Port Philip Survey 1957-1963. Memoirs of the National Museum of Victoria, Melbourne 27: 201-288
 Phillips, D.A.B., Handreck, C., Bock, P.E., Burn, R., Smith, B.J. & Staples, D.A. (eds) 1984. Coastal Invertebrates of Victoria: an atlas of selected species. Melbourne : Marine Research Group of Victoria & Museum of Victoria 168 pp.
 Wilson, B. 1993. Australian Marine Shells. Prosobranch Gastropods. Kallaroo, Western Australia : Odyssey Publishing Vol. 1 408 pp.

External links
 To World Register of Marine Species
 

tiberiana
Gastropods of Australia
Gastropods described in 1863